Martin County is a county located in the southeastern part of the state of Florida, in the United States. As of the 2020 census, the population was 158,431. Its county seat is Stuart. Martin County is in the Port St. Lucie, FL Metropolitan Statistical Area.

History
Martin County was created in 1925 with the northern portion coming from St. Lucie County and southern portion coming from Palm Beach County. It was named for John W. Martin, Governor of Florida from 1925 to 1929.

When the county was created, the western contour followed the shore of Lake Okeechobee, as did the borders of Glades, Okeechobee, and Hendry counties. Palm Beach County had historically claimed all of the surface of the lake as part of its area, to its benefit for the distribution of state and federal highway funds. The state representative of Martin County, William Ralph Scott of Stuart, initiated a bill to divide the lake among its adjacent counties, creating a more equitable distribution of state funds for road creation and maintenance. All bordering counties confirmed the justice of this change and supported its ratification, with the exception of Palm Beach County. Representatives from Palm Beach County later presented Representative William Scott with a jug of water, signifying "all the water Bill Scott left Palm Beach County." The jug is in the possession of Stuart Heritage.

Geography
It is the fifth-largest county in Florida by land area, and fifty-third largest by total area.

Adjacent counties
 St. Lucie County – north
 Palm Beach County – south
 Hendry County – southwest
 Glades County – southwest
 Okeechobee County – northwest

National protected area
 Hobe Sound National Wildlife Refuge

Environment

Martin County Shore Protection Project
According to the U.S. Army Corps of Engineers, the Martin County Shore Protection Project includes nourishment of approximately 3.75 miles of beach extending from the St. Lucie County line south to the Stuart Public Beach Park in Martin County.  Included in the project is restoration of the primary dune and a 35-foot-wide protective berm.  The renourishment interval for this project is every 7 years.

The last renourishment of the Martin County Shore Protection Project was completed in May 2013 and included a Flood Control and Coastal Emergency component due impacts incurred with the  passage of Hurricane Sandy in 2012.  The next
renourishment event is scheduled for 2019.

The estimated total cost of this project is $69.9 million, $32.5 million of which is to be paid for by the U.S. Federal Government.  In Fiscal Year 2015, no funding was appropriated to the project by the U.S. Congress.  In the Fiscal Year 2016 U.S. President's Budget Request to the U.S. Congress, no funding dollars was requested for the project.

Demographics

2020 census

As of the 2020 United States census, there were 158,431 people, 65,014 households, and 40,328 families residing in the county.

2000 census
As of the census of 2000, there were 126,731 people, 55,288 households, and 36,213 families residing in the county. The racial makeup of the county was 89.88% White, 5.27% Black or African American, 0.30% Native American, 0.60% Asian, 0.10% Pacific Islander, 2.72% from other races, and 1.14% from two or more races.  7.50% of the population were Hispanic or Latino of any race.

In 2000 there were 55,288 households, out of which 21.50% had children under the age of 18 living with them, 55.00% were married couples living together, 7.40% had a female householder with no husband present, and 34.50% were non-families. 29.00% of all households were made up of individuals, and 16.00% had someone living alone who was 65 years of age or older.  The average household size was 2.23 and the average family size was 2.71.

In the county, the population was spread out, with 18.60% under the age of 18, 5.30% from 18 to 24, 22.90% from 25 to 44, 24.90% from 45 to 64, and 28.20% who were 65 years of age or older.  The median age was 47 years. For every 100 females, there were 96.40 males.  For every 100 females age 18 and over, there were 94.20 males.

The median income for a household in the county was $43,083, and the median income for a family was $53,244. Males had a median income of $36,133 versus $27,000 for females. The per capita income for the county was $29,584.  About 5.60% of families and 8.80% of the population were below the poverty line, including 13.80% of those under age 18 and 5.20% of those age 65 or over.

Transportation

Airports
 Indiantown Airport
 Naked Lady Ranch Airport (private)
 Witham Field

Major highways

  Interstate 95
  Florida's Turnpike
  U.S. Highway 1
  U.S. Highway 98
  U.S. Highway 441
  State Road A1A
  State Road 76
  County Road 707
  State Road 710
  State Road 714
  State Road 732

Trails
The Lake Okeechobee Scenic Trail, a segment of the Florida National Scenic Trail, passes through Martin County.

Government
Martin County is a non-chartered county and its form of government is prescribed by the Florida Constitution and Florida Statutes, as follows:

Board of County Commissioners

The Board of County Commissioners is the legislative body of the county and has charge of all county executive  and administrative functions, except those assigned by the Constitution to independent county officers or to the independent school district. The board also has some quasi-judicial functions. Some of functions exercised by the board are county-wide, while others are applicable only in the unincorporated areas of the county, where the board has many of the functions of a municipality. The county commissioners are elected by county-wide vote, but each one represents a specific district.  The board appoints the county administrator who is responsible to it for the day-to-day operations of the county government. The current county commissioners by district number are:
 1. Doug Smith, Vice Chair
 2. Stacey Hetherington, Chair
 3. Harold Jenkins
 4. Sarah Heard
 5. Edward Ciampi

Constitutional officers
The elected Constitutional officers are:
 Clerk (Clerk of Courts, County Clerk, etc.):  Carolyn Timmann
 Property Appraiser: Jenny Fields
 Sheriff: William Snyder
 Supervisor of Elections: Vicki Davis
 Tax Collector: Ruth Pietruszewski

School district
The independent Martin County School District has a board appointed superintendent of schools and an elected school board, as follows:
 The superintendent, Dr. John D. Millay, is the chief administrator of the district.
 The school board is the legislative body of the district and also exercises quasi-judicial powers. School Board members are elected county wide but each one represents a specific district. The current board members by district are:
 1. Marsha Powers, Chair
 2. Tony Anderson, Vice Chair
 3. Christia Li Roberts
 4. Victoria Defenthaler
 5. Michael DiTerlizzi

Electoral politics
Martin County is a long-standing Republican stronghold which has not supported a Democrat for the White House since Franklin Delano Roosevelt in 1944. Registered Democrats are third in the county, outnumbered by not only Republicans but also Unaffiliated voters.

Voter registration
According to the Secretary of State's office, Republicans are a majority of registered voters in Martin County.

Libraries
The Martin County Library System has 6 branches.
 Blake Library (Stuart)
 Elisabeth Lahti Library (Indiantown)
 Hobe Sound Public Library (Hobe Sound)
 Hoke Library (Jensen Beach)
 Peter & Julie Cummings Library (Palm City) 
 Robert Morgade Library (South Stuart)

Attractions

 Audubon of Martin County: Possum Long Nature Center, Palm Beach Road, Stuart
 Elliott Museum on Hutchinson Island
 Jonathan Dickinson State Park in South Martin County
 Martin County Fair held every February.
 Martin County Public Beaches:
 Hobe Sound Public Beach on Jupiter Island
 Jensen Sea Turtle Beach, Stuart Beach and many beach strips on Hutchinson Island.
 Savannas Preserve State Park (extends into St. Lucie County)
 St. Lucie Inlet Preserve State Park on Long Island east of Port Salerno and north of Jupiter Island

Historic areas
On the National Register of Historic Places:
 Hobe Sound
 Olympia School, 1925
 Trapper Nelson Zoo Historic District, located south of Hobe Sound is inside Jonathan Dickinson State Park in southern Martin County, 1933
  Hutchinson Island
 House of Refuge at Gilbert's Bar, 1876
 Georges Valentine Shipwreck Site, 1904
 Indiantown
 Seminole Inn, 1926
 Jensen Beach
 Mount Elizabeth Archeological Site, prehistoric
 Stuart Welcome Arch, 1926
 Tuckahoe, 1938
 Jupiter Island
 Gate House, 1927
 Stuart
 Burn Brae Plantation-Krueger House, 1894
 Lyric Theatre, 1927
 Old Martin County Courthouse, 1937
Other historic areas listed in 1989 by the Florida Chapter of the American Institute of Architects:
 All Saints Episcopal Church, Waveland, 2377 N.E. Patrician Street, 1898,
 Bay Tree Lodge (Kiplinger House), 143 S. River Road (originally 104 S. Sewall's Point Road), Sewall's Point, 1909
 Dudley-Bessey House, 110 S.W. Atlanta Avenue, Stuart, 1909
 Dyer Homestead, 1006 S.W. St. Lucie Crescent, Stuart, 1904
 Feroe Building, 73 S.W. Flagler Avenue, corner of St. Lucie, Stuart, 1913
 France Apartments, 524 St. Lucie Crescent, Stuart, 1927
 Golden Gate Building, 3225 S.E. Dixie Highway in Golden Gate south of Stuart, 1925
 Kitching House, 210 S.W. Atlanta Avenue, Stuart, 1894
 Stuart Feed Store, 101 S.W. Flagler Avenue, Stuart, 1905
 Sunrise Inn, S.E. Old St. Lucie Boulevard, Port Sewall. ca. 1925 (demolished)
 John E. Taylor House, 204 S.E. Atlanta Avenue, Stuart, 1914
Other places listed in 2012 by the Florida Chapter of the American Institute of Architects in its Florida Architecture: 100 Years. 100 Places.
 Beach Road 2, Jupiter Island

Communities

City
 Stuart

Towns
 Jupiter Island
 Ocean Breeze
 Sewall's Point

Villages
 Indiantown

Census-designated places

 Hobe Sound
 Jensen Beach
 North River Shores
 Palm City
 Port Salerno
 Rio

Other unincorporated places
 Hutchinson Island (part)
 Port Mayaca

Gallery

See also
 National Register of Historic Places listings in Martin County, Florida

References

External links

 
Florida counties
1925 establishments in Florida
Port St. Lucie metropolitan area
Populated places established in 1925
Port St. Lucie, FL Metropolitan Statistical Area